Louis C. Hunter (1898 – 1984) was a professor of economic history at American University. His most famous work, Steamboats on the Western Rivers, an Economic and Technological History, was published in 1949.

Hunter grew up in a steamboat culture as he spent his first eighteen years living on the banks of the Ohio River, at Wellsburg, West Virginia, and the Mississippi River, at Moline, Illinois. After studying engineering and economic history at Harvard University, he received a doctorate in 1928. For the next twenty years, Hunter was engaged in research for Steamboats on the Western Rivers. In 1952, his scholarship was  acknowledged when he was awarded the Dunning Prize by the American Historical Association.

In 1937, Hunter joined the faculty of American University where he was a professor of history until his retirement in 1966.  In 1979, the first volume of his trilogy, A History of Industrial Power in the United States, 1780-1930, was published. In 1983, Dr. Hunter was awarded the Leonardo da Vinci Medal by the Society of History of Technology.

Hunter was married and the father of two daughters. Louis C. Hunter died on March 22, 1984.

References

Bibliography
Hunter, Louis C. (1949). Steamboats on the western rivers, an economic and technological history. Cambridge: Harvard University Press
Hunter, Louis C. (1979). A history of industrial power in the United States, 1780-1930: water power. Charlottesville, Va.: University Press of Virginia
Hunter, Louis C. (1985). A history of industrial power in the United States, 1780-1930: steam power. Charlottesville, Va.: University Press of Virginia
Hunter, Louis C. and Lynwood Bryant (1991). A history of industrial power in the United States, 1780-1930: the transmission of power. Boston: MIT Press

1898 births
1984 deaths
Harvard University alumni
20th-century American historians
20th-century American male writers
American economic historians
Historians of technology
20th-century American economists
Leonardo da Vinci Medal recipients
American male non-fiction writers
People from Wellsburg, West Virginia
Historians from West Virginia
Economists from West Virginia